Dwight George McLean (born in October 28, 1988) is an American football defensive back who is currently a free agent. He played college football at Purdue University.

Early life
McLean attended Santiago High School in Corona, California.

College career

Fullerton College
After high school McLean attended Fullerton College

McLean committed to Purdue University on February 26, 2008. McLean was not heavily recruited, only landing football scholarships from 3 FBS schools (New Mexico State, San Diego State and Purdue).

Purdue
McLean's play netted him a scholarship to continue his football career at Purdue University. He was named a starting safety midway through the season in 2008, and was a starter in 2009.

Professional career

San Jose SaberCats
McLean signed with the San Jose SaberCats of the Arena Football League in 2011. McLean lead the SaberCats with 80 tackles on the season.

Arizona Rattlers
In 2012, McLean was assigned to the Arizona Rattlers. McLean was later released before the season ended.

San Antonio Talons
Later in 2012b McLean was assigned to the San Antonio Talons. McLean helped the Talons finish the season with a 14-2 record, but the Talons fell short of the ArenaBowl.

New Orleans VooDoo
8 weeks into the 2013 season, McLean was assigned to the New Orleans VooDoo.

Portland Thunder
On December 20, 2013, McLean was selected by the Portland Thunder in the 2014 AFL Expansion Draft.

Las Vegas Outlaws
On November 5, 2014, McLean was assigned to the Las Vegas Outlaws. He was placed on recallable reassignment on May 26, 2015.

Return to Portland
On June 3, 2015, McLean was assigned to the Portland Thunder.

References

External links
 Purdue Boilermakers bio 

1988 births
Living people
American football defensive backs
Fullerton Hornets football players
Purdue Boilermakers football players
San Jose SaberCats players
Arizona Rattlers players
San Antonio Talons players
New Orleans VooDoo players
Portland Thunder players
Las Vegas Outlaws (arena football) players
Portland Steel players
Ottawa Redblacks players
Players of American football from California
Sportspeople from Corona, California